Flight 553 may refer to:

TWA Flight 553, mid-air collision on 9 March 1967
United Airlines Flight 553, crashed on 8 December 1972

0553